TVB News Channel (previously TVB iNews) is a 24-hour non-stop Cantonese news and information channel based in Hong Kong and Asia, utilizing the resources of TVB News, and operated by TVB. The channel provides news and information updates every 30 minutes.

References

External links 
 Official website
 Watch TVB News Channel for Free in Canada - TVB Anywhere North America

TVB channels
Television stations in Hong Kong
Television channels and stations established in 2004
2004 establishments in Hong Kong